Fernand Léon Auguste Lechanteur (known as Gires-Ganne; 20 June 1910 Agon-Coutainville – 7 May 1971 Caen) was a French poet, ethnologist and linguist from Normandy.

External links
 Fernand Lechanteur-Gires Ganne; Magène

1910 births
1971 deaths
French ethnologists
Linguists from France
Norman language
French poets
20th-century linguists